Aluo (Naluo) is a Loloish language spoken by the Yi people of China. It is also known by its Nasu name Laka (also Gan Yi, Yala, Lila, Niluo).

Names
Gao (2017:31) notes that in Wuding County, Yunnan, Aluo and Naluo are equivalent terms for the same Yi subgroup. Naluo in the Wuding County Gazetteer (1990) actually refers to Aluo speakers (Gao 2017:31). Naluo is not to be confused with Naruo, a Taloid (Central Loloish) language of northern Yunnan.

Locations
Aluo is spoken in north Wuding, Luquan, and Yuanmou counties, Yunnan, and in Huili and Miyi counties, Sichuan. Gao (2017) reports that Aluo (also known as the Gan Yi) is spoken in northwestern Wuding County as well as in Sichuan. YYFC (1983) documents Aluo of Dongpo Township 东坡傣族乡, Wuding County, Yunnan.

References

External links 
 An open access archive collection of Aluo (Yi) recordings are available at Kaipuleohone. 

Loloish languages
Languages of China